Russell Bentley (born 1960), also known as "Texas", is an American man who has fought for the self-proclaimed Donetsk People's Republic. He was a YouTuber until his channel was deleted early in 2022.

Bentley, a self-declared communist, came to global attention in 2022, with a series of statements, and videos, about his intention to liberate Ukraine from "Nazis". Rolling Stone covered his story under the headline "The Bizarre Story of How a Hardcore Texas Leftist Became a Frontline Putin Propagandist". By July 2016, he had been baptized into the Russian Orthodox Church.

See also  

Eva Bartlett
Patrick Lancaster
Russian information war against Ukraine

External links

Notes 

1960 births
American bloggers
American activists
United States Army soldiers
Date of birth missing (living people)
Living people